An Orchestrated Rise to Fall is the debut LP by The Album Leaf, released in 1999.

Track listing

References

1999 debut albums
The Album Leaf albums